The Central European Jamboree is a Scouting jamboree for Scouts of Central European nations.

History
In 1931 a camp was held in Prague called Camp of Slavic Scouts, with participants from throughout Europe. Four years later, in 1935, the Central European Jamboree was organised in Spała, Poland. After a 50-year-long break, Czech Scouts came up with the idea to revitalise these meetings.

List of events

Gallery

See also 
 European Scout Jamboree

External links
 History of CEJs. Central European Jamboree 2014
 Website of the 11th Central European Jamboree 2012 in Slovakia

References

Central Europe
Scouting jamborees
Recurring events established in 1931